The 2018–19 LSU Lady Tigers basketball team represented Louisiana State University during the 2018–19 NCAA Division I women's basketball season college basketball season. The Lady Tigers, led by eighth-year head coach Nikki Fargas, played their home games at Pete Maravich Assembly Center and are members of the Southeastern Conference.

The Lady Tigers finished the season 16–13, 7–9 in SEC play. As a 6th seed, they lost in the second round of the SEC women's tournament to Tennessee. They missed being selected for the NCAA Division I Tournament and were invited to play in the Women's National Invitation Tournament but declined.

Previous season
The Lady Tigers finished the 2017–18 season 19–10, 11–5 in SEC play to finish in a four-way tie for fourth place. As a 4th seed, they lost in the quarterfinals of the SEC women's tournament to Texas A&M. They received an at-large bid to the NCAA women's tournament where were upset by Central Michigan in the first round.

Roster

Schedule

|-
!colspan=12 style=| Exhibition

|-
!colspan=12 style=| Non-conference regular season

|-
!colspan=12 style=|SEC regular season

|-
!colspan=12 style=|SEC Women's Tournament

Rankings

^Coaches' Poll did not release a second poll at the same time as the AP.

References

LSU Lady Tigers basketball seasons
LSU
LSU L
LSU L